Dmitri Valerievich Levinsky  (born June 23, 1981) is a Kazakhstani-Russian retired professional ice hockey player. He last played for HK Almaty in the Kazakhstan Hockey Championship. He is the graduate of Ust-Kamenogorsk ice hockey school. He drafted 46th overall in the 1999 NHL Entry Draft by Chicago Blackhawks, but never signed a contract with them, and played his entire career in Russia and Kazakhstan.

External links

1981 births
Arlan Kokshetau players
Amur Khabarovsk players
Chicago Blackhawks draft picks
HC Khimik Voskresensk players
Metallurg Novokuznetsk players
HKM Zvolen players
Kazakhstani ice hockey forwards
Living people
Molot-Prikamye Perm players
Sportspeople from Oskemen
Salavat Yulaev Ufa players
Severstal Cherepovets players
SKA Saint Petersburg players
Torpedo Nizhny Novgorod players
Russian ice hockey forwards
Yertis Pavlodar players
Russian expatriate sportspeople in Slovakia
Kazakhstani expatriate sportspeople in Slovakia
Expatriate ice hockey players in Slovakia
Russian expatriate ice hockey people
Kazakhstani expatriate ice hockey people